Kunshan Forest Park is an urban park in Kunshan, China. Built in 2001, the 166 hectare park is located in the northwest of the city, near Duke Kunshan University. The park was designed by PLAT Studio, a California-based lansdscape architecture firm.

References 

Parks in China
Kunshan
Urban public parks in China